= Eswatini–Mozambique relations =

- Eswatini: Mozambique

Eswatini–Mozambique relations refers to the relations between the Kingdom of Eswatini and the Republic of Mozambique.

The two nations share a 108 kilometre-long border.
